Michael "Much" Mair (born 13 February 1962) is an Italian alpine skiing coach and former Alpine skier. Born in Bruneck, Italy, he won a total of three World Cup races.  He closed 10th in overall in 1988 Alpine Skiing World Cup. He also competed at the 1984 Winter Olympics and the 1988 Winter Olympics.

In 2018 Mair is one of the coaches of the Italy national alpine ski team (women sector).

World Cup victories

See also
 Italian skiers who closed in top 10 in overall World Cup

References

External links
 

1962 births
Living people
Sportspeople from Bruneck
Italian male alpine skiers
Germanophone Italian people
Alpine skiers of Centro Sportivo Carabinieri
Italian alpine skiing coaches
Olympic alpine skiers of Italy
Alpine skiers at the 1984 Winter Olympics
Alpine skiers at the 1988 Winter Olympics